Christian Brucia (born 2 February 1988) is a German footballer who plays for TSV Buchbach.

External links

1988 births
Living people
German footballers
German people of Italian descent
Eintracht Frankfurt II players
SV Wacker Burghausen players
SV Waldhof Mannheim players
3. Liga players
Association football midfielders
TSV Buchbach players
Sportspeople from Offenbach am Main
Footballers from Hesse